is a former Japanese football player.

Club statistics

References

External links

1980 births
Living people
University of Tsukuba alumni
Association football people from Shizuoka Prefecture
Japanese footballers
J1 League players
J2 League players
Japan Football League players
Shimizu S-Pulse players
Sagan Tosu players
Montedio Yamagata players
Blaublitz Akita players
Association football midfielders